Indiana Humanities is a nonprofit organization based in Indianapolis that funds and produces public humanities programming throughout the state of Indiana. It is one of 56 humanities councils in the United States and is affiliated with the National Endowment for the Humanities.

History 

The first iteration of Indiana Humanities was established in 1972 when the National Endowment for the Humanities encouraged the formation of the Indiana Committee for the Humanities, a statewide grantmaking organization made up of five Hoosiers. Since its inception Indiana Humanities has been a part of many special projects around the state, including leading a task force in 1991 that resulted in the establishment of the International School of Indiana.

Indiana Humanities has been headquartered in the historic Georgian Revival home of Indiana author Meredith Nicholson since 1986.

Current Activities

Grants 
 Humanities Initiative Grant: provides nonprofit organizations in Indiana with funds to support humanities programs for public audiences. 
 Historic Preservation Education Grant: given in partnership with Indiana Landmarks to fund educational projects related to historic properties in Indiana.

Programs 
 Next Indiana Campfires: a series of statewide programming that blends nature walks, literature and discussion with the help of local humanities scholars and naturalists. This program won the Schwartz Prize for best humanities program in 2017.
 Novel Conversations: a free statewide lending library that loans more than 600 titles to reading groups across Indiana.
 Historic Bar Crawl: an annual bar crawl presented in partnership with Indiana Historical Society in its sixth year that reenacts notable scenes in Indianapolis history at surprising locations. Past themes have included the 1970s and the Cold War.
 INconversation: a speaker program that brings thought leaders from around the country to Indiana for small group discussions.
 Indiana Authors Awards: a biannual book award celebrating Indiana literature. First established in 2009, The Eugene and Marilyn Glick Indiana Authors Awards are given to the best books by Indiana authors written in eight different categories and published during the previous two years.

Thematic initiatives 
In 2017–2018, Indiana Humanities deployed a series of programming exploring the relationship between STEM disciplines and the humanities called Quantum Leap. This initiative included a slate of statewide programming around the classic novel Frankenstein, for which Indiana Humanities was given a $300,000 grant from the National Endowment for the Humanities.

Past thematic initiatives include Food for Thought, Spirit of Competition and Next Indiana.

References

Footnotes

Sources
 Bennett, Taylor. "Indiana to Mark Frankenstein's 200th Birthday." WFYI Indianapolis. Web. 2 January 2018.Indiana to celebrate Frankenstein's 200th birthday
"Indiana Nonprofit Wins National Award For Campfires Program." WFYI Indianapolis. Web. 21 November 2017.Indiana Nonprofit Wins National Award For Campfires Program
Petry, Ashley. "Beer, books, bio engineering: Indy gets frank with Frankenstein." Indianapolis Star. Web. 12 September 2017. Beer, books, bio engineering: Indy gets frank with Frankenstein
"NEH Announces $39.3 Million for 245 Humanities Projects Nationwide." National Endowment for the Humanities. Web. 2 August 2017.
Bongiovanni, Domenica. "That time the Pacers almost left Indy is just one of the stories on this bar crawl." Indianapolis Star. 9 June 2017.That time the Pacers almost left Indy is just one of the stories on this bar crawl
Grossman, Dan. "TILT: It's what graffiti and wool blankets have in common." NUVO. 19 October 2016. TILT: It's what graffiti and wool blankets have in common
Goins, Alexa. "Next Indiana Campfires: Good literature, thoughts and beers." Indianapolis Star. 12 August 2016. Next Indiana Campfires: Good literature, thoughts and beers
"Food for Thought: An Indiana Harvest." Northeast Indiana Regional Partnership. 19 October 2012. Food For Thought: An Indiana Harvest
 "Humanities Council Announces Grant Recipients." Inside Indiana Business. Web. 5 April 2010. 
 Kelley, Erin, and Cassie Stockamp. "Civic Dialogue Fosters Sense of Community." Indianapolis Star. 10 January 2010. Print.

External links
 Indiana Humanities
 National Endowment for the Humanities
 The Federation of State Humanities Councils

National Endowment for the Humanities
Non-profit organizations based in Indianapolis